Dendropsophus carnifex, the executioner tree frog, executioner clown frog or hangman swamp frog, is a species of frog in the family Hylidae.

It is found in Ecuador and possibly Colombia. Its natural habitats are between 1250 and 2500 meters above sea level in subtropical or tropical forests, subtropical or tropical moist montane forests, swamps, freshwater marshes, intermittent freshwater marshes, plantations, rural gardens, heavily degraded former forest, ponds, and canals and ditches.

This frog has a snout-vent length under 3.5 cm and proportionately large climbing disks on its toes.  Its body is robust and longer than it is wide.    Its front and hind feet are webbed, but there is more webbing on the hind feet.  The male frog does not have nuptial pads.

Its back is bronze-green or bronze-gray in color, with brown or brown-gray marks.  Its belly is yellow or yellowish-white in color.

This frog's English and Latin names refer to John D. Lynch, who collected many of the samples. "Lynching" is a form of execution.

References

 Pintanel, P., Salinas‐Ivanenko, S., Gutiérrez‐Pesquera, L.M., Almeida‐Reinoso, F., Merino‐Viteri, A. & Tejedo, M. 2019. Extreme colour variation in the larvae of the executioner clownfrog, Dendropsophus carnifex (Anura: Hylidae), living in nearby ponds of different light exposure and duration. Austral Ecology

carnifex
Endemic fauna of Ecuador
Amphibians of Ecuador
Amphibians described in 1969
Taxonomy articles created by Polbot